Foothills or piedmont are geographically defined as gradual increases in elevation at the base of a mountain range, higher hill range or an upland area. They are a transition zone between plains and low relief hills and the adjacent topographically higher mountains, hills, and uplands.  Frequently foothills consist of alluvial fans, coalesced alluvial fans, and dissected plateaus.

Description
Foothills primarily border mountains, especially those which are reached through low ridges that increase in size closer and closer to the mountain, but can also border uplands and higher hills.

Examples
Areas where foothills exist, or areas commonly referred to as the foothills, include the:

Sierra Nevada foothills of California, USA
Foothills of the San Gabriel Valley in Los Angeles County, California, USA
Rocky Mountain Foothills in British Columbia and Alberta, Canada
Silesian Foothills in Silesia, Poland
Sivalik Hills along the Himalayas in the Indian subcontinent
Catalina Foothills near Tucson, Arizona, USA
Appalachian foothills in Western North Carolina and Northwestern South Carolina, USA
Margalla hills near the Himalayas in Pakistan
The Duars, Chos and Terai on the foothills of Himalayas (India)
The foothills around Boise in Idaho, USA
'The foothills' of the Dandenong Ranges in Melbourne, Australia. Generally the area from Ferntree Gully/Boronia/The Basin through to Belgrave.
'The foothills' of the Blue Mountains in Sydney, Australia.
The foothills of the Southern Alps in Mid-Canterbury, New Zealand.
The Judean Foothills between the Judean Mountains and Mediterranean Coastline in Israel.

Synonyms
Another word for a foothill region is "piedmont", derived from "foot of the mount" in Romance languages. The Piedmont region of Italy lies in the foothills of the Alps, and several other foothills in other parts of the world are called "piedmont", and include:
The piedmont of the United States which consists of the eastern foothills of the Appalachian Mountains.

Ecosystems of piedmonts (foothills) are often known as submontane zones, relating to the higher montane ecosystems.

References

Hills
Slope landforms